Lemonade is a sweetened lemon-flavored beverage.

There are varieties of lemonade found throughout the world. In North America and South Asia, cloudy still lemonade is the most common variety. There it is traditionally a homemade drink using lemon juice, water, and a sweetener such as cane sugar, simple syrup or honey. In the United Kingdom, Ireland, Central Europe, Australia, and New Zealand, a carbonated lemonade soft drink is more common. Despite the differences between the drinks, each is known simply as "lemonade" in countries where it is dominant.

The suffix "-ade" may also be applied to other similar drinks made with different fruits, such as limeade, orangeade, or cherryade.

History
A drink made with lemons, dates, and honey was consumed in 13th and 14th century Egypt, including a lemon juice drink with sugar, known as qatarmizat. In 1676, a company known as Compagnie de Limonadiers sold lemonade in Paris. Vendors carried tanks of lemonade on their backs and dispensed cups of the soft drink to Parisians. 

While carbonated water was invented by Joseph Priestley in 1767 (with his pamphlet Directions for Impregnating Water with Fixed Air published in London in 1772), the first reference found to carbonated lemonade was in 1833 when the drink was sold in British refreshment stalls. R. White's Lemonade has been sold in the UK since 1845.

Varieties

Cloudy lemonade
The predominant form of lemonade found in the US, Canada, and India, cloudy lemonade, also known as traditional or old fashioned lemonade in the UK and Australia, is non-carbonated and made with fresh lemon juice; however, commercially produced varieties are also available. Generally served cold, cloudy lemonade may also be served hot as a remedy for congestion and sore throats, frozen, or used as a mixer.

Traditionally, children in US and Canadian neighborhoods start lemonade stands to make money during the summer months. The concept has become iconic of youthful summertime Americana to the degree that parodies and variations on the concept exist across media. References can be found in comics and cartoons such as Peanuts, and the 1979 computer game Lemonade Stand.

Pink lemonade
A popular variation of traditional lemonade, pink lemonade, is created by adding additional fruit juices, flavors, or food coloring to the recipe. Most store-bought pink lemonade is simply colored with concentrated grape juice or dyes.

A 1912 obituary credited the invention of pink lemonade to circus worker Henry E. "Sanchez" Allott, saying he had dropped in red cinnamon candies by mistake.

Another origin story credits another circus worker, Pete Conklin, in 1857. His brother George Conklin tells the story in his 1921 memoir. According to the story, Conklin's lemonade was a mixture of water, sugar and tartaric acid, with the tub garnished with a single lemon that he repeatedly used for the season. One day, he ran out of water. Searching desperately, he found a tub of water a bareback rider had recently used to rinse her pink tights. Adding in the sugar, acid and remaining bits of lemon, he offered the resulting mixture as "strawberry lemonade" and saw his sales double.

Clear lemonade

The predominant form of lemonade in the UK, Ireland, France, Germany, Switzerland, South Africa and Australia is a clear, lemon-flavoured carbonated beverage. Schweppes, R. White's Lemonade and C&C are common brands, and shops usually carry a store-branded lemonade as well. Schweppes uses a blend of lemon and lime oils. Other fizzy drinks, soft-drinks (or pop) which are both lemon and lime flavoured may also sometimes be referred to as lemonade, such as Sprite and 7 Up. There are also speciality flavours, such as Fentimans Rose Lemonade, which is sold in the UK, the US, and Canada. Shandy, a mixture of beer and clear lemonade, is often sold pre-bottled, or ordered in pubs.

Brown lemonade
There are various drinks called brown lemonade. In Northern Ireland, brown lemonade is flavoured with brown sugar. A variant from Venezuela has cane sugar and lime.

Other varieties
In India and Pakistan, where it is commonly known as nimbu paani, and in Bangladesh, lemonades may also contain salt and/or ginger juice. Shikanjvi is a traditional lemonade from this region, and can also be flavored with saffron, cumin and other spices.

Limonana, a type of lemonade made from freshly squeezed lemon juice and mint leaves, is a common summer drink in the Middle East. In Northern Africa, a drink called cherbat is made of lemon, mint, and rose water.

Switcha is a version of the drink made in the Bahamas and Turks & Caicos that can also be made with limes instead of lemons.

Citron pressé

In France, it is common for bars or restaurants to offer citron pressé, also called citronnade, an unmixed version of lemonade in which the customer is given lemon juice, syrup and water separately to be mixed in their preferred proportions.

Health effects
The high concentration of citric acid in lemon juice is the basis for popular culture recommendations of consumption of lemonade to prevent calcium-based kidney stones. Studies have not demonstrated that lemonade causes a sustained improvement of urine pH, increased citric acid concentration in urine, reduction in supersaturation by stone-forming salts, or prevention of recurrent stones.

Gallery

See also

 Chanh muối
 Hard lemonade
 Lemonade cocktail
 Lemon-lime drink
 Lemon squash
 Lemon, lime and bitters
 List of juices
 List of lemon dishes and beverages
 Ramune
 Red lemonade – Ireland
 When life gives you lemons, make lemonade

References

External links

 Of the Street Sale of Ginger-Beer, Sherbet, Lemonade,&C., from London Labour and the London Poor, Volume 1, Henry Mayhew, 1851; subsequent pages cover the costs and income of street lemonade sellers.
 

 
Frozen drinks
Lemon drinks
Fruit juice
English drinks
Symbols of Arizona
Independence Day (United States) foods